ISO/IEC 15693, is an ISO/IEC standard for vicinity cards, i.e. cards which can be read from a greater distance as compared with proximity cards. Such cards can normally be read out by a reader without being powered themselves, as the reader will supply the necessary power to the card over the air (wireless).

ISO/IEC 15693 systems operate at the 13.56 MHz frequency, and offer maximum read distance of 1–1.5 meters.  As the vicinity cards have to operate at a greater distance, the necessary magnetic field is less (0.15 to 5 A/m) than that for a proximity card (1.5 to 7.5 A/m).

Example applications 
 Ski pass: each of those has a unique ID and the system knows for how long the pass is valid etc.

Communication to the card 
Communication from the reader to the card uses an amplitude-shift keying with 10% or 100% modulation index. 

The data coding is:

1 out of 4 pulse-position modulation 2 bits are coded as the position of a 9.44 μs pause in a 75.52 μs symbol time, giving a bit rate of 26.48 kilobits per second. The least-significant bits are sent first.
1 out of 256 pulse-position modulation 8 bits are coded as the position of a 9.44 μs pause in a 4.833 ms symbol time, giving a bit rate of 1.65 kbit/s.

Communication to the reader 
The card has two ways to send its data back to the reader:

Amplitude-shift keying 
Amplitude-shift keying 100% modulation index on a 423.75 kHz subcarrier.  The data rate can be:
 Low 6.62 kbit/s (fc/2048)
 High 26.48 kbit/s (fc/512)

A logic 0 starts with eight pulses of 423.75 kHz followed by an unmodulated time of 18.88 μs (256/ fc); a logic 1 is the other way round. The data frame delimiters are code violations, a start of frame is: 
 an unmodulated time of 56.64 μs (768/ fc),
 24 pulses of 423.75 kHz
 a logic 1

and the end of a frame is:
 a logic 0
 24 pulses of 423.75 kHz
 an unmodulated time of 56.64 μs

The data are sent using a Manchester code.

Frequency-shift keying 
Frequency-shift keying by switching between a 423.75 kHz sub carrier (operating frequency divided by 32) and a 484.25 kHz sub carrier (operating frequency divided by 28). The data rate can be:
 Low 6.67 kbit/s (fc/2032)
 High 26.69 kbit/s (fc/508)

A logic 0 starts with eight pulses of 423.75 kHz  followed by nine pulses of 484.28 kHz; a logic 1 is the other way round. The data frame delimiters are code violations, a start of frame is: 

 27 pulses of 484.28 kHz
 24 pulses of 423.75 kHz
 a logic 1

and the end of a frame is:
 a logic 0
 24 pulses of 423.75 kHz
 27 pulses of 484.28 kHz

The data are sent using a Manchester code.

Manufacturer codes 
see ISO/IEC 7816-6
Code 0x01: Motorola
Code 0x02: ST Microelectronics
Code 0x03: Hitachi
Code 0x04: NXP Semiconductors
Code 0x05: Infineon Technologies
Code 0x06: Cylinc
Code 0x07: Texas Instruments Tag-it
Code 0x08: Fujitsu Limited
Code 0x09: Matsushita Electric Industrial
Code 0x0A: NEC
Code 0x0B: Oki Electric
Code 0x0C: Toshiba
Code 0x0D: Mitsubishi Electric
Code 0x0E: Samsung Electronics
Code 0x0F: Hyundai Electronics
Code 0x10: LG Semiconductors
Code 0x12: WISeKey
Code 0x16: EM Microelectronic-Marin
Code 0x1F: Melexis
Code 0x2B: Maxim Integrated
Code 0x33: AMIC
Code 0x39: Silicon Craft Technology
Code 0x44: GenTag, Inc (USA)
Code 0x45: Invengo Information Technology Co.Ltd

Implementations 
The first byte of the UID should always be 0xE0.

Products with ISO/IEC 15693 interface 
 EEPROM: various manufacturers like ST Microelectronics or NXP offer EEPROMs readable via ISO/IEC 15693.
 μController: Texas Instruments offers a small μController entirely powered by the ISO/IEC 15693 reading field and capable of reading a simple temperature sensor, wirelessly providing the value of that to the reader.

External links 
ISO/IEC 15693-1:2010 Identification cards — Contactless integrated circuit cards — Vicinity cards — Part 1: Physical characteristics
ISO/IEC 15693-2:2006 Identification cards — Contactless integrated circuit cards — Vicinity cards — Part 2: Air interface and initialization
ISO/IEC 15693-3:2009 Identification cards — Contactless integrated circuit cards — Vicinity cards — Part 3: Anticollision and transmission protocol

15693